The 1983 Masters Tournament was the 47th Masters Tournament, held April 7–11 at Augusta National Golf Club in Augusta, Georgia. Seve Ballesteros won his second Masters and third major title, four strokes ahead of runners-up Ben Crenshaw and Tom Kite. Play on Friday was postponed due to heavy rain, and the final round was completed on Monday for the first time since 1973.

Defending champion Craig Stadler was tied for the 54-hole lead with 1976 champion Raymond Floyd, with Ballesteros one stroke back, and two-time champion Tom Watson an additional stroke behind. Ballesteros got off to a fast start in the final round on Monday with a birdie-eagle start. With another birdie at the difficult par-3 fourth, he added four pars and another birdie at the ninth for a five-under 31 on the front nine. Ballesteros cruised to a 69 (−3) and a comfortable win as neither Stadler, Floyd, nor Watson broke par.

During the postponement of Friday's round, the possibility was raised that the tournament would not complete the entire 72 holes, as the southeastern U.S. was experiencing heavy rains and flooding and forecasts were not favorable.

Saturday's second round went off from split tees (1st and 10th) and six players did not complete their rounds until early Sunday morning. With this extension, the tournament committee did not attempt to complete the final two rounds on Sunday, opting for the third round only on Sunday and the fourth on Monday.

Four-time champion Arnold Palmer, 53, opened with a 68 on Thursday and made the cut at the Masters for the final time. In his 29th Masters, he stated that the conditions on Saturday were the worst he had ever seen at Augusta. Five-time winner Jack Nicklaus 43, withdrew before his second round start time due to back spasms experienced while warming up. Nicklaus had shot a first round of 73. It was only his second withdrawal as a pro, the first was three years earlier at the 1980 World Series of Golf. Nicklaus had missed only one cut in the previous 23 Masters and made ten consecutive after this year, including his record sixth green jacket in 1986.

It was the final major championship for Sam Snead, 70, a three-time Masters champion. He withdrew after a first round 79 as he assessed he could not make the cut.

Caddie policy change
This was the first year that players were allowed to use their own caddies, rather than those of Augusta National. Twelve players continued to use caddies from the club, including Nicklaus. The first female caddie at the Masters appeared this year as George Archer, the 1969 champion, employed his 19-year-old daughter Elizabeth. She had carried the bag for her father for twenty previous events since the summer of 1980. Archer finished tied for twelfth, one of his better finishes at Augusta.

Field
1. Masters champions
Tommy Aaron, George Archer, Seve Ballesteros (3,8), Gay Brewer, Billy Casper, Charles Coody, Raymond Floyd (4,8,10,11,12,13), Doug Ford, Bob Goalby, Jack Nicklaus (2,3,4,8,9,11,12,13), Arnold Palmer, Gary Player (8), Sam Snead, Craig Stadler (8,11,12), Art Wall Jr., Tom Watson (2,3,8,9,12,13), Fuzzy Zoeller (8,9,12)

Jack Burke Jr., Jimmy Demaret, Ralph Guldahl, Claude Harmon, Ben Hogan, Herman Keiser, Cary Middlecoff, Byron Nelson, Henry Picard, and Gene Sarazen did not play.

The following categories only apply to Americans

2. U.S. Open champions (last five years)
Hale Irwin (12,13), Andy North

3. The Open champions (last five years)
Bill Rogers (9,11,12,13)

4. PGA champions (last five years)
John Mahaffey, Larry Nelson (8,12,13)

5. 1982 U.S. Amateur semi-finalists
Rick Fehr (a), Jim Hallet (a), Jay Sigel (6,7,a), David Tolley (a)

6. Previous two U.S. Amateur and Amateur champions
Nathaniel Crosby (7,a)

7. Members of the 1982 U.S. Eisenhower Trophy team
Jim Holtgrieve (a), Bob Lewis (a)

8. Top 24 players and ties from the 1982 Masters Tournament
Andy Bean (12), Ben Crenshaw (13), Danny Edwards (9,12), Bob Gilder (10,11,12), Morris Hatalsky, Mark Hayes, Peter Jacobsen (12), Tom Kite (11,12,13), Wayne Levi (11,12), Bruce Lietzke (11,12,13), Jodie Mudd, Dan Pohl (9), Jack Renner, John Schroeder, Jim Simons (10), Curtis Strange (12), Tom Weiskopf (11,12)

Jerry Pate (12,13) did not play

9. Top 16 players and ties from the 1982 U.S. Open
Chip Beck, Bobby Clampett (11,12), Jay Haas (10,11,12), Gary Koch (11), Lyn Lott, Calvin Peete (10,11,12), Larry Rinker, Scott Simpson (12), J. C. Snead, Lanny Wadkins (10,11,12)

10. Top eight players and ties from 1982 PGA Championship
Fred Couples

11. Winners of PGA Tour events since the previous Masters
Keith Fergus (12), Gary Hallberg, Scott Hoch (12), Johnny Miller (12,13), Gil Morgan (12), Mike Nicolette, Tim Norris, Ed Sneed (12), Payne Stewart, Hal Sutton (12)

12. Top 30 players from the 1982 PGA Tour money list
George Burns

13. Members of the U.S. 1981 Ryder Cup team
Lee Trevino

14. Foreign invitations
Isao Aoki (11), Bruce Devlin (9), Nick Faldo, David Graham (2,4,8,9), Yutaka Hagawa (8), Hsieh Min-Nan, Sandy Lyle, Tsuneyuki Nakajima, Greg Norman (10), Peter Oosterhuis (8), Philippe Ploujoux (6,a), Bob Shearer (11), Martin Thompson (6,a)

Numbers in brackets indicate categories that the player would have qualified under had they been American.

Round summaries

First round
Thursday, April 7, 1983

Source:

Second round
Saturday, April 9, 1983
Sunday, April 10, 1983

Play on Friday was completely washed out due to rain and the second round started on Saturday;six players did not finish the second round until Sunday morning.

Source:

Third round
Sunday, April 10, 1983

Source:

Final round
Monday, April 11, 1983

Final leaderboard

Sources:

Scorecard

Cumulative tournament scores, relative to par

References

External links
 – Past winners and results
 Augusta.com – 1983 Masters leaderboard and scorecards

1983
1983 in golf
1983 in American sports
1983 in sports in Georgia (U.S. state)
April 1983 sports events in the United States